Angioletti is an Italian surname. Notable people with the surname include:

Giovanni Battista Angioletti (1896–1961), Italian writer and journalist
Matteo Angioletti (born 1980), Italian artistic gymnast

Italian-language surnames